Sigurd Rosted (born 22 July 1994) is a Norwegian professional footballer who plays as a centre-back for Major League Soccer club Toronto FC and the Norway national team.

Described as a calm and intelligent centre-back with leading abilities, Rosted began his career in his native Norway and made the move to Belgian Gent in January 2018 before making the move to Brøndby one-and-a-half year later. He won the Danish Superliga with Brøndby in 2021, before joining Toronto FC in Major League Soccer in January 2023.

Rosted is an international for Norway, receiving his first call-up in 2017 and gaining his first international cap in 2018 in a friendly against Albania, in which he also scored a goal.

Club career

Early career
Born in Oslo, Rosted played youth football Hasle-Løren and Kjelsås, before joining Sarpsborg 08 ahead of the 2015 season. Prior to signing, he had been diagnosed with Bekhterev's disease, a type of arthritis mainly affecting his back, but medication allowed him to play professionally. Rosted made his professional debut in September 2015 against Odds BK.

Gent
On 7 January 2018, Rosted signed a three-and-a-half-year deal with Belgian First Division A side Gent. On 24 January, he made his Gent debut against Royal Antwerp in the First Division A as a substitute in a 1–1 draw away, playing the last 45 minutes in place of Nana Asare. He finished the 2017–18 season with 8 appearances for the club.

The following season Rosted established himself as a starter in the Gent first team, playing 38 matches and scoring 6 goals in all competitions. However, towards the end of the season he saw less playing time, as Timothy Derijck was preferred in the centre of defense.

Brøndby
On 27 August 2019, Rosted moved to Denmark to join Superliga club Brøndby on a four-year deal for an undisclosed fee, reported to be around €300,000. He made his competitive debut for the club on 1 September, playing 90 minutes as Brøndby lost 1–0 away to FC Midtjylland in the Superliga. Rosted soon found himself as a regular starter in the first team, establishing a partnership in central defense with fellow summer signing, Andreas Maxsø.

Rosted scored his first goal for the club on 7 June 2020 in a 3–2 loss to AC Horsens, a header in the 64th minute. In his first season for Brøndby, he made 26 total appearances in which he scored one goal.

Rosted had a strong start to the 2020–21 season, scoring a last minute winner in a 3–2 home win over Nordsjælland. He continued his form in the derby against Copenhagen, marking the controversial former Brøndby player Kamil Wilczek. Rosted then scored again on 2 October in a 1–2 away win over Randers FC, a 14th minute header after a corner kick provided from Jesper Lindstrøm, as he was voted Man of the Match by fans afterwards. His performances strongly contributed to Brøndby having an undefeated start to the season after four games; the club's best start in the Superliga in 15 years. At the end of the season, Brøndby won their first league title in 16 years after a 2–0 victory against Nordsjælland. Rosted contributed with 25 total appearances that season, scoring three goals.

Toronto FC
On 31 January 2023, Brøndby IF announced that Rosted had left the club to sign for Major League Soccer club Toronto FC. Toronto FC announced the signing on 7 February, having using Targeted Allocation Money (TAM) for the transfer to sign Rosted to a three-year deal with an option for 2026. He made his debut for the Reds starting in a 3–2 defeat to D.C. United away at Audi Field on 26 February 2023.

International career
In 2017, he was called up to the Norwegian national team for the first time in his career, as a replacement for injured Tore Reginiussen before the friendly match against Sweden on 13 June. He played his first international match on 26 March 2018 in a friendly against Albania, scoring the only goal in a 1–0 win. He had been substituted in for Håvard Nordtveit in the 63rd minute.

Career statistics

Club

International
Scores and results list Norway's goal tally first.

Honours
Brøndby
 Danish Superliga: 2020–21

References

External links
 MLS profile
 Sigurd Rosted at Brøndby IF
 

1994 births
Living people
Footballers from Oslo
Association football defenders
Norwegian footballers
Norway under-21 international footballers
Norway international footballers
Norwegian expatriate footballers
Kjelsås Fotball players
Sarpsborg 08 FF players
K.A.A. Gent players
Brøndby IF players
Toronto FC players
Eliteserien players
Norwegian Second Division players
Belgian Pro League players
Danish Superliga players
Major League Soccer players
Expatriate footballers in Belgium
Expatriate men's footballers in Denmark
Expatriate soccer players in Canada
Norwegian expatriate sportspeople in Belgium
Norwegian expatriate sportspeople in Denmark
Norwegian expatriate sportspeople in Canada
People with ankylosing spondylitis